Bernhard Lloyd (born Bernhard Gössling on 2 June 1960) is a former member and co-founder of the German synth-pop band Alphaville.

Before he joined the band, he did not play keyboards – instead, he was previously a club DJ.

In 2001, Lloyd also worked on a project named Atlantic Popes with singer Max Holler, a 13-track CD. He left Alphaville in 2003.

Lloyd produces German bands in his studio, mainly electronic music in Berlin. He remixed the catalog of Alphaville, and remains in contact with lead singer Marian Gold.

References

External links

1960 births
German male musicians
Living people
German new wave musicians
Synth-pop new wave musicians
Alphaville (band) members